*Haglaz or *Hagalaz is the reconstructed Proto-Germanic name of the h-rune , meaning "hail" (the precipitation).

In the Anglo-Saxon futhorc, it is continued as hægl, and, in the Younger Futhark, as  hagall. The corresponding Gothic letter is 𐌷  h, named hagl.

The Elder Futhark letter has two variants, single-barred  and double-barred . The double-barred variant is found in continental inscriptions, while Scandinavian inscriptions have exclusively the single-barred variant.

The Anglo-Frisian futhorc in early inscriptions has the Scandinavian single-barred variant. From the 7th century, it is replaced by the continental double-barred variant, the first known instances being found on a Harlingen solidus (ca,. 575–625), and in the Christogram on St Cuthbert's coffin.

Haglaz is recorded in all three rune poems:

See also

Elder Futhark
Rune poem
Hagal (Armanen rune)

References 

Runes